Malagascoderes is a genus of beetles in the family Buprestidae, containing the following species:

 Malagascoderes goudotti (Thomson, 1878)
 Malagascoderes scriptus (Thery, 1937)

References

Buprestidae genera